Bazoft may refer to:
 Bazoft (city)
 Bazoft District
 Bazoft Rural District